Viju Mane is a Marathi film screenwriter, director, lyricist, producer, and actor from Maharashtra, India who is well known for his movies like Shikari, Bioscope, Pandu, Monkey Baat, Rege among the few.  Apart from direction and writing, Viju has also acted in many films like 'Rege' and 'Prabho Shivaji Raja'.

Film career
Viju Mane's directorial debut 'Gojiri' (2007) starred Sunil Barve, Abhijeet Chavan, Arun Nalawade and Madhura Velankar in pivotal roles. In 2012, he tackled a sensitive subject in 'Khel Mandala'  which had very subtly layers of human relationships, disability, and manipulative nature of the media starring Mangesh Desai and Urmila Kanetkar.

He made his acting debut in Abhijit Panse's crime drama 'Rege' (2014) which revolved around a college student (played by Aaroh Velankar) who becomes engulfed in the criminal underworld when he crosses the path of a mysterious small-time gangster named 'M Bhai'. It starred Viju Mane, Mahesh Manjrekar and Santosh Juvekar in lead roles. The Mahesh Manjrekar produced Shikari (2018) - a tribute to legend Dada Kondke and his adult comedies was directed by him. It marked the debut of Neha Khan and Survat Joshi.

Filmography

Television

References

External links
 Viju Mane at IMDb
 Viju Mane at Twitter

Indian film directors
Male actors in Marathi cinema
Living people
People from Kolhapur
Male actors in Marathi television
Film directors from Maharashtra
Marathi film directors
Indian male screenwriters
Indian lyricists
Indian male film actors
Male actors from Mumbai
Film directors from Mumbai
Film producers from Mumbai
Marathi film producers
21st-century Indian film directors
21st-century Indian male actors
Year of birth missing (living people)